Taekwondo took place from December 7 to December 10 at the 1998 Asian Games in Thammasat University, Gymnasium 7, Bangkok, Thailand. Each country (except the host nation) was limited to having 6 men and 6 women for the entire competition.

Medalists

Men

Women

Medal table

References
 WTF Hall of Fame
 Results

 
1998 Asian Games events
1998
Asian Games